St Jarlath's Park (Páirc Naomh Iarflaith, commonly known as Tuam Stadium) is a GAA stadium in Tuam, County Galway, Ireland.  It is one of the principal stadiums of Galway GAA's football teams.  The ground once had a capacity of around 26,000.  This has progressively been reduced for safety reasons and has most recently been reduced to 6,700.

The official opening of the stadium took place on 21 May 1950.  It was blessed and officially opened by the Archbishop of Tuam, Rev. Dr Walsh.  The stadium opened with two games, one between Cavan and Mayo and the other between Galway and Dublin.

See also
 List of Gaelic Athletic Association stadiums
 List of stadiums in Ireland by capacity

References

External links
 Stadium redevelopment site

Buildings and structures in Tuam
Gaelic games grounds in the Republic of Ireland
Galway GAA
Sport in Tuam
Sports venues in County Galway